James Robert Brooks (born December 28, 1958) is an American former professional football player who was a running back in the National Football League (NFL). He played college football played for the Auburn Tigers. He played for four teams in the NFL, earning all four of his Pro Bowl selections with the Cincinnati Bengals.

High school and college career
Brooks led the Warner Robins High School Demons to both state and national championships in 1976. He graduated with the school record for rushing, a record that stood until Willie Reid broke his record years later. Brooks played college football at Auburn University from 1977 until 1980 and earned All-American status, setting school records for kickoff-return yards (1,726) and all-purpose yards (5,596) while also scoring 30 touchdowns.

Professional career
Brooks was drafted with the 24th pick in the first round of the 1981 NFL Draft, and played professionally with the San Diego Chargers (1981–1983), the Cincinnati Bengals (1984–1991), the Cleveland Browns (1992) and the Tampa Bay Buccaneers (1992).

He was a key participant in two of the most famous games in NFL lore during his rookie season with the Chargers: The Epic in Miami and the Freezer Bowl. However, he started only seven games in three seasons with the Chargers, always second on the team to Chuck Muncie in rushing attempts and yards. He had only one 100-yard game with the Chargers, a 12-carry, 105-yard, three-touchdown outing against his future teammates. In 1984, he was traded to the Bengals for Pete Johnson, a move still widely regarded as the best trade in Bengals franchise history, as Johnson would play only one more season in the NFL before retiring.

A four-time Pro Bowler (1986, 1988–1990), Brooks excelled at running, receiving and kick returning. He was noted for his ability to make yards after contact and continue fighting for extra inches while being tackled. By the time he left the Bengals in 1991, he was the team's all-time leading rusher with 6,447 yards (since surpassed by Corey Dillon's 8,061 yards), and is still among the Bengals' top 15 all-time leading receivers with 297 receptions for 3,012 yards. By the time of his retirement after the 1992 season, Brooks amassed 7,962 rushing yards, 383 receptions for 3,621 receiving yards, 565 punt return yards, 2,762 kickoff return yards and scored 79 touchdowns (49 rushing and 30 receiving). Between 1968 (when John David Crow and Timmy Brown retired) and 2005 (Marshall Faulk), Brooks was the only member of the 30/30 club (30+ rushing and receiving touchdowns, accomplished by only seven players). , Brooks' 14,910 total net yards rank him #36 on the NFL's list of career all-purpose yards.

Though he started every game in 1985, he and fullback Larry Kinnebrew finished the season with almost identical carry and yardage stats. His breakthrough season was 1986, which included a memorable run in a December 7 contest against the New England Patriots in which Brooks made several cutbacks, broke several tackles and dragged defenders the final five yards across the goal line for a 56-yard touchdown run. He finished the game with 163 yards rushing and 101 yards receiving, one of only two 100/100 games in Bengals history. This was his sixth season in the league, but the first in which he reached 1,000 rushing yards (a then-franchise record 1,087 rushing yards) and the Pro Bowl. After missing half of the 1987 season with an injury, he returned with 931 yards and career-bests in rushing touchdowns (eight) and receiving touchdowns (six) in 1988 and was instrumental in the Bengals' run to Super Bowl XXIII. In 1989, he finished with a career-best/franchise-record 1,239 rushing yards (seventh in the NFL) and again broke 1,000 yards in 1990, including a 201-yard performance against the Houston Oilers. Brooks started 1991 with two games with more than 100 rushing yards, but had progressively fewer carries over the rest of the season (102 rushes for two touchdowns and a 3.3 yards-per-carry average, never once breaking 50 yards over the next 12 games). He was traded to the Browns in 1992, then to the Buccaneers midway through the season, retiring after a minor injury in the team's sixth game.

NFL career statistics

, Brooks holds at least five Bengals franchise records, including:
 Rush yards/attempt: career 4.8, season 5.61 in 1989
 Yards from scrimmage in a season: 1,773 in 1986
 All-purpose yards in a season: 1,773 in 1986
 Games with 3+ touchdowns scored in a season: 2 in 1988

Personal life
Brooks was arrested in 1999 for failure to pay child support, owing over $110,000. During proceedings, it was revealed that Brooks was illiterate, despite having received a college degree. When asked by the judge how he had graduated from Auburn, Brooks said, "I didn’t have to go to class." He served three months of a six-month sentence before being assigned to a work-release program.

References

External links
 

1958 births
Living people
American football running backs
Auburn Tigers football players
Cincinnati Bengals players
Cleveland Browns players
San Diego Chargers players
Tampa Bay Buccaneers players
American Conference Pro Bowl players
People from Warner Robins, Georgia
Players of American football from Georgia (U.S. state)
African-American players of American football
20th-century African-American sportspeople
21st-century African-American sportspeople